Lokmanya Tilak Terminus–Coimbatore Express (train number: 11013/11014) is a daily express train of Indian Railways and operated by Central Railway zone, running between Lokmanya Tilak Terminus (Mumbai) and Coimbatore Junction.

Schedule
Train number 11013 starts from Lokmanya Tilak Terminus at 22:35 hours and reaches Coimbatore at 06:50 hours on the third day. Train number 11014 leaves Coimbatore Junction at 08:50 hours and reaches Lokmanya Tilak Terminus at 13:45 hours.

Rakes
The train has 1 AC first class, 4 AC two-tier, 9 AC three-tier, 3 sleeper classes, 1 pantry car, 2 general second class coaches and 2 generator/luggage cars. The train has been equipped with LHB coaches.

Traction
This train was hauled by GOC WDP4D between CBE and SBC and from SBC till LTT, this train is hauled by KJM based WAP-7 and vice versa until the electrification of the Salem-Bangalore Section via Hosur. It is now hauled by ED, AJJ or RPM WAP-4 or WAP-7 throughout the journey.

Route and halts 

The important halts of the train are:

 
 
 
 
 Kurduwadi Junction 
 
 
 
 
 
 
 Hosur
 Dharmapuri
 
 
 Tiruppur

Direction Reversal

Train Reverses its direction 1 times:

Notes

See also
 Famous trains
 Bikaner - Coimbatore SF AC Express
 Mumbai CST - Kanniyakumari Jayanti Janta Express
 Kurla

References

External links
 11013 Coimbatore Express
 11014 Lokmanya Tilak Express
 Kurla Express time table
Coimbatore Railway Junction

Express trains in India
Rail transport in Maharashtra
Rail transport in Karnataka
Rail transport in Telangana
Rail transport in Andhra Pradesh
Rail transport in Tamil Nadu
Transport in Mumbai
Transport in Coimbatore
Railway services introduced in 1992